Tarihi Kadırga (Turkish for "historical galley") is an Ottoman galley constructed in the late 16th or early 17th century for the use of Ottoman sultans on inshore waters. She is the only surviving original galley in the world, and has the world's oldest continuously maintained wooden hull.

Design 
She had two masts, but these are now removed.

History 
Tarihi Kadırga's date of construction is unknown. However, it is presumed that she was built in Istanbul in the period between the reigns of Sultan Murad III (1574–1595) and Sultan Mehmed IV (1648–1687), as evidenced by AMS radiocarbon dating and dendrochronological research. The ship had a long service life, remaining in use until the reign of Sultan Mahmud II (1808–1839). 

The first recorded mention of her dates from 1861, when the Istanbul newspaper Şehbal stated she was recorded by a French naval architect. In 1885, the ship underwent major repairs ordered by Sultan Abdulhamid II, in which decayed planks below the waterline were replaced, and the ship was refurbished. The galley was kept at the Topkapı Palace until 1913, when she was moved to the Imperial Naval Arsenal at Kasımpaşa. 

By 1923, she was in a state of disrepair, with photographs published in The Mariner's Mirror showing damage to her lower strakes. However, by 1939, another photograph published in National Geographic Magazine showed her condition to have improved. The kiosk was restored in 1944, and the hull in 1950. During this restoration, some of the decoration on her hull was repainted by members of Istanbul University's Fine Arts Faculty. She remained at Kasımpaşa until 1956, when she was moved again, now to Beşiktaş, where she stayed until her final move in 1970. This time she was moved by barge to the Istanbul Naval Museum. She was given another restoration in 1982 and 1983, which included the replacement of decorative elements and repainting of the entire ship.

Gallery

See also 
List of sailing ships of the Ottoman Empire
 Real (galley), a Spanish flagship galley.
 Mendam Berahi, a flagship galley of Malacca sultanate.
 La Réale, a French flagship galley.

Notes

References

External links 

Images of Tarihi Kadırga

Galleys
Ottoman Empire
16th-century ships
Museum ships in Turkey
Ships preserved in museums